Coprinus comatus, the shaggy ink cap, lawyer's wig, or shaggy mane, is a common fungus often seen growing on lawns, along gravel roads and waste areas. The young fruit bodies first appear as white cylinders emerging from the ground, then the bell-shaped caps open out. The caps are white, and covered with scales—this is the origin of the common names of the fungus. The gills beneath the cap are white, then pink, then turn black and deliquesce ('melt') into a black liquid filled with spores (hence the "ink cap" name). This mushroom is unusual because it will turn black and dissolve itself in a matter of hours after being picked or depositing spores.

When young it is an excellent edible mushroom provided that it is eaten soon after being collected (it keeps very badly because of the autodigestion of its gills and cap). If long-term storage is desired, microwaving, sauteing or simmering until limp will allow the mushrooms to be stored in a refrigerator for several days or frozen. Also, placing the mushrooms in a glass of ice water will delay the decomposition for a day or two so that one has time to incorporate them into a meal. Processing or icing must be done whether for eating or storage within four to six hours of harvest to prevent undesirable changes to the mushroom. The species is cultivated in China as food.

Taxonomy
The shaggy ink cap was first described by Danish naturalist Otto Friedrich Müller in 1780 as Agaricus comatus, before being given its current binomial name in 1797 by Christiaan Hendrik Persoon. Its specific name derives from coma, or "hair", hence comatus, "hairy" or "shaggy".  Other common names include lawyer's wig, and shaggy mane.

Coprinus comatus is the type species for the genus Coprinus. This genus was formerly considered to be a large one with well over 100 species. However, molecular analysis of DNA sequences showed that the former species belonged in two families, the Agaricaceae and the Psathyrellaceae. Coprinus comatus is the best known of the true Coprinus.

Description
The shaggy ink cap is easily recognizable from its almost cylindrical cap which initially covers most of its stem. It is mostly white with shaggy scales, which are more pale brown at the apex. The free gills change rapidly from white to pink, then to black. It is deliquescent. Microscopically, the mushroom lacks pleurocystidia. The spore print is black-brown and the spores measure 10–13 by 6.5–8 µm. The flesh is white and the taste mild.

Similar species 
The mushroom can sometimes be confused with the magpie fungus which is poisonous. In America, the 'vomiter' mushroom Chlorophyllum molybdites is responsible for most cases of mushroom poisoning due to its similarity with shaggy mane and other edible mushrooms. Coprinopsis atramentaria (the common Ink Cap) is similar, and contains coprine and can induce coprine poisoning, particularly when consumed with alcohol. Podaxis pistillaris is also similar.

Distribution, habitat and ecology
It grows in groups in places which are often unexpected, such as green areas in towns. It occurs widely in grasslands and meadows in Europe and North America, from June through to November in the UK. It appears to have been introduced to Australia, New Zealand and Iceland. In Australia the species is sufficiently common to have been featured on a postage stamp issued by Australia Post in 1981.

Coprinus comatus is a nematophagous fungus capable of killing and digesting the nematode species Panagrellus redivivus and Meloidogyne arenaria.

Edibility
The young mushrooms, before the gills start to turn black, are a choice edible mushroom, but should be prepared soon after being collected as the black areas quickly turn bitter. The taste is mild; cooking produces a large quantity of liquid.  It can sometimes be used in mushroom soup with parasol mushroom.  Large quantities of microwaved-then-frozen shaggy manes can be used as the liquid component of risotto, replacing the usual chicken stock.

Coprinus comatus is not to be confused with Coprinopsis atramentaria, which can induce coprine poisoning, particularly when consumed with alcohol. Symptoms of coprine poisoning include vomiting, diarrhoea, palpitations and a metallic taste in the mouth.

Gallery

References
Much of the above article was translated from the French page and Dutch pages.

Further reading
 Pierre Montarnal: Le petit guide: Champignons (Genève, 1964; Paris-Hachette, 1969; in French).
 Régis Courtecuisse, Bernard Duhem: Guide des champignons de France et d'Europe (Delachaux & Niestlé, 1994–2000).  
 Roger Phillips: Mushrooms and other fungi of Great Britain and Europe (Pan Books Ltd. 1981 / Book Club Associates 1981) - for the English names.

External links

 Fungus of the Month for May 2004: Coprinus comatus, the shaggy mane by Tom Volk, TomVolkFungi.net.
 "Coprinus comatus: The Shaggy Mane"  by Michael Kuo, MushroomExpert.com, September, 2001.
 "California Fungi: Coprinus comatus", MykoWeb.com.
 "Wild About Mushrooms: Shaggy Mane Mushroom" by Louise Freedman, MykoWeb.com.
 

Agaricaceae
Fungi described in 1780
Fungi of Europe
Fungi of New Zealand
Edible fungi
Carnivorous fungi
Fungal pest control agents
Fungi of Iceland